Franklin Edward Cover (November 20, 1928 – February 5, 2006) was an American actor best known for starring in the sitcom The Jeffersons. His character, Tom Willis, was half of one of the first interracial marriages to be seen on prime-time television.

Life and career
Cover was born on November 20, 1928, in Cleveland, Ohio, to Britta (Schreck) and Franklin Held Cover.  He graduated from John Marshall High School in 1947.  Cover graduated from Denison University in 1951, and he received his MA in Theater in 1954 and MFA in Theater in 1955 both from Case Western Reserve University.

His career started on the stage acting in Henry IV, Part 1 and Hamlet. He also appeared in Forty Carats with Julie Harris. He made his television debut on Naked City and later appeared on The Jackie Gleason Show.

In 1965, he married Mary Bradford Stone.

His first starring role was on The Jeffersons as Tom Willis (a Caucasian man) who was married to an African-American woman, Helen, played by Roxie Roker. The couple lived in the same high-rise apartment building as the sitcom's title characters. Cover would often be the foil to Sherman Hemsley's black businessman character, George Jefferson. The sitcom ran from 1975 to 1985. He also appeared in The Stepford Wives in 1975, and played Hubert Humphrey in the 1982 TV movie A Woman Called Golda.

Following the end of The Jeffersons, Cover continued to make guest appearances on television shows as well as appearing in a supporting role in Wall Street (1987). In 1994, he appeared in the second episode of ER. His final television appearance was in an episode of Will & Grace (entitled "Object Of My Rejection") that aired on May 13, 1999.

Cover died at the Lillian Booth Actors Home in Englewood, New Jersey, on February 5, 2006. He had been living at the home since December 2005 while recovering from a heart condition, and died of pneumonia.

Filmography

References

External links

Obituary at Legacy.com
"Jeffersons Star moves on up" at E! Online, February 10, 2006
 "Franklin Cover, 77, comic foil to Sherman Hemsley" at Boston Globe, February 12, 2006
 

1928 births
2006 deaths
American male film actors
American male television actors
Case Western Reserve University alumni
Male actors from Cleveland
People from Englewood, New Jersey
Male actors from New Jersey
20th-century American male actors
American male stage actors
Denison University alumni
Deaths from pneumonia in New Jersey